I, Hamlet (Italian: Io, Amleto) is a 1952 Italian comedy film directed by Giorgio Simonelli and starring Erminio Macario, Franca Marzi and Rossana Podestà. A parody of William Shakespeare's tragedy Hamlet, its lack of commercial success led the newly formed production company Macario Film to a rapid bankruptcy.

The film's sets were designed by the art directors Arrigo Breschi and Saverio D'Eugenio. It was shot at the Palatino Studios in Rome.

Cast
 Erminio Macario as Hamlet 
 Franca Marzi as Valchiria 
 Rossana Podestà as Ophelia
 Adriano Rimoldi as Laertes 
 Luigi Pavese as King Claudius
 Marisa Merlini as Queen Gertrude 
 Giuseppe Porelli as Polonius
 Virgilio Riento as  Anturius
 Carlo Rizzo as Horatio
 Silvio Noto as Rosadorno 
 Sergio Bergonzelli as Fencing Master
 Guido Riccioli as Jorik il buffone 
 Manlio Busoni as Ambasciatore d'Inghilterra 
 Giancarla Vessio as Ausonia
 Giovanni Onorato as Guardia reale

References

External links
 

1952 films
1950s Italian-language films
Films directed by Giorgio Simonelli
Films based on Hamlet
Italian parody films
Films with screenplays by Ruggero Maccari
Films with screenplays by Giovanni Grimaldi
Films with screenplays by Mario Amendola
Italian comedy films
1952 comedy films
Italian black-and-white films
Films shot at Palatino Studios
1950s Italian films